Persicaria dichotoma is a species of flowering plant native to Australia and Asia.

References

Flora of New South Wales
Perennial plants
dichotoma